Vincent van den Berg (born 19 January 1989) is a Dutch footballer who plays as a forward. He played for Arsenal, Go Ahead Eagles, FC Zwolle and Excelsior Maassluis.

Club career
Born in Schiedam, Rotterdam, Van den Berg started off as a youth at Feyenoord's Academy. He went on to play for SC Heerenveen, prior to moving to Arsenal at the age of 17 during the summer of 2006. He played for both Arsenal's Academy  and Reserve teams, but only in pre-season friendlies for the first team, most notably as a substitute in Dennis Bergkamp's testimonial match.

On January 7, 2008 Arsenal officially confirmed he would go on loan to Go Ahead Eagles for the second half of the 2007-08 season. He made his debut for Eagles, starting in a friendly match against Samsunspor, during which he was injured and had to be substituted after 25 minutes of play. After recovering, he went on to be capped a total of four times for Go Ahead, without any goals scored altogether.

On 12 August 2008, Van den Berg joined FC Zwolle on loan, for the 2008-09 season, but did not play for the first team, due to injuries.

With his Arsenal contract due to expire in the summer of 2009, he was offered a trial with Sparta Rotterdam, but was again injured. Van den Berg then joined up with Excelsior Maassluis in August 2009. Whilst featuring at and away from the Lavendelstraat, Van Den Berg was victorious in 2013's Hoofdklasse. He also went on with Excelsior, to win the Derde Divisie title of
2016. With this victory Excelsior earned promotion to the Tweede Divisie.

International career
Van den Berg played for the Netherlands U17 team, and so was a member of the side that went on to win a bronze medal at the 2005 FIFA U-17 World Cup in Peru.

Honours

Club
Excelsior Maassluis
Hoofdklasse: 2013
Derde Divisie: 2016

International
Holland
 2005 FIFA U-17 World Cup: Bronze Medal.

References

External links
 Career stats - Voetbal International
 Vincent van den Berg - Official Twitter

1989 births
Living people
Footballers from Schiedam
Association football wingers
Dutch footballers
Arsenal F.C. players
Go Ahead Eagles players
PEC Zwolle players
Excelsior Maassluis players
Eerste Divisie players
Tweede Divisie players